In enzymology, an aldehyde dehydrogenase (NADP+) is an enzyme that catalyzes the chemical reaction

an aldehyde + NADP+ + H2O  an acid + NADPH + H+

The 3 substrates of this enzyme are aldehyde, NADP+, and H2O, whereas its 3 products are acid, NADPH, and H+.

This enzyme belongs to the family of oxidoreductases, specifically those acting on the aldehyde or oxo group of donor with NAD+ or NADP+ as acceptor.  The systematic name of this enzyme class is aldehyde:NADP+ oxidoreductase. Other names in common use include NADP+-acetaldehyde dehydrogenase, NADP+-dependent aldehyde dehydrogenase, and aldehyde dehydrogenase (NADP+).  This enzyme participates in caprolactam degradation.

References

 
 Boyer, P.D., Lardy, H. and Myrback, K. (Eds.), The Enzymes, 2nd ed., vol. 7, Academic Press, New York, 1963, p. 203-221.
 
 

EC 1.2.1
NADPH-dependent enzymes
Enzymes of unknown structure